This is list of palaces in Indonesia. Seven out of them are presidential palace.

References

Palaces
Palaces
Indonesia